Kasr-e Asef (also Romanized as Kasr-e Āşef, Kaşr-e Āşef, and Kaşr Āşef; also known as Kasrāset and Khāsrās) is a village in Khenejin Rural District, in the Central District of Komijan County, Markazi Province, Iran. At the 2006 census, its population was 465, in 101 families.

References 

Populated places in Komijan County